is Japanese idol group NMB48's third single. It was released on January 25, 2012. This is the first single to feature members from Team M which was formed on January 26, 2012. The single was released in four editions: Type-A, Type B, Type-C and a Theater edition, all of which contains different B-sides. Upon its release "Junjō U-19" topped the Oricon weekly chart and Billboard Japan Hot 100.

Live performances
The group first performed the song during the Hey! Hey! Hey! 2011 Christmas special which aired on December 19.

Members
On December 18, 2011, the  members were revealed.

"Junjou U-19"
 Team N: Mayu Ogasawara, Kanako Kadowaki, Rika Kishino, Haruna Kinoshita, Riho Kotani, Rina Kondo, Kei Jonishi, Miru Shiroma, Aina Fukumoto, Nana Yamada, Sayaka Yamamoto, Miyuki Watanabe
 Team M: Momoka Kinoshita, Eriko Jo, Fuuko Yagura, Keira Yogi

"Baatari Go!"
Performed by Undergirls
 Team N: Kanna Shinohara, Yuuki Yamaguchi
 Team M: Riona Ota, Rena Kawakami, Yuuka Kodokari, Yui Takano, Airi Tanigawa, Ayame Hikawa, Runa Fujita, Mao Mita, Ayaka Kurakami, Sae Murase, Natsumi Yamagishi
 Kenkyuusei: Yuki Azuma, Yuumi Ishida, Mizuki Uno, Risako Okada, Ayaka Okita, Narumi Koga, Arisa Koyanagi, Sorai Sato, Hiromi Nakagawa, Rurina Nishizawa, Momoka Hayashi, Mizuki Hara, Hitomi Yamamoto

"Doryoku no Shizuku"
Performed by Shirogumi
 Team N: Mayu Ogasawara, Kanako Kadowaki, Rika Kishino, Haruna Kinoshita, Kanna Shinohara, Nana Yamada, Sayaka Yamamoto
 Team M: Yuuka Kodakari, Eriko Jo, Natsumi Yamagishi, Keira Yogi
 Kenkyuusei: Ayaka Okita

"Migi e Magare!"
Akagumi
 Team N: Riho Kotani, Rina Kondo, Kei Jonishi, Miru Shiroma, Aina Fukumoto, Yuuki Yamaguchi, Miyuki Watanabe
 Team M: Momoka Kinoshita, Airi Tanigawa, Ayame Hikawa, Ayaka Murakami, Fuuko Yagura

"Renai no Speed"
NMB Seven
 Team N: Mayu Ogasawara, Kei Jonishi, Aina Fukumoto, Nana Yamada, Sayaka Yamamoto, Miyuki Watanabe
 Kenkyuusei: Eriko Jo

"Jungle Gym"
 Team N: Sayaka Yamamoto

Charts and certifications

Weekly charts

References

2012 singles
Japanese-language songs
Songs with lyrics by Yasushi Akimoto
Oricon Weekly number-one singles
Billboard Japan Hot 100 number-one singles
NMB48 songs
2012 songs